The H&M Design Award is an design prize for fashion graduates. The prize was established in 2012 to support young designers with starting careers in fashion. The prize is awarded every year by Hennes & Mauritz AB (H&M), a Swedish multinational clothing-retail company.

Recipients

See also

 List of fashion awards

References

External links
 H&M Design Award Official Website

Fashion awards
Design awards
Awards established in 2012